Lindsey Gale Miller-Lerman (born July 30, 1947) is a justice of the Nebraska Supreme Court, appointed by Governor Ben Nelson in 1998. She is the first woman on the court. Miller-Lerman retained in 2014 and 2020; her term expires in 2026.

Early life 
Miller-Lerman was born in Los Angeles, California, to father Avy Miller, an engineer who founded Laars-Engineers (which is now called Laars Heating Systems), and Roberta Miller (née Levey).

She received a Bachelor of Arts with honors from Wellesley College in 1968, where she was a classmate of Hillary Clinton. She and  Clinton were both political science majors.

After graduating from Wellesley, Miller-Lerman worked at a Cleveland legal aid clinic. She obtained a Juris Doctor from Columbia Law School in 1973 and an Honorary Doctorate from the College of St. Mary in 1993.

Career 
From 1973 to 1975, Miller-Lerman clerked for Judge Constance Baker Motley, a United States District Judge for the Southern District of New York. After this time, Miller-Lerman and her husband moved from New York to Nebraska.

Private practice 
In 1976, Miller-Lerman joined the law firm of Kutak Rock & Huie, now Kutak Rock. From 1976 to 1979, Miller-Lerman was an associate; from 1980 to 1992, she was a partner. She was at Kutak Rock until her appointment to the Nebraska Court of Appeals. Miller-Lerman worked part-time as a partner at Kutak Rock while she raised her children. This part-time agreement did not penalize Miller-Lerman's chances for promotion, which Miller-Lerman credited to senior partner Bob Kutak's influence. Her regular schedule was three days a week, but since Miller-Lerman specialized in litigation, her schedule was adjusted when she had cases that went to court.

Judgeship 
In 1992, Miller-Lerman was appointed as a judge in the Nebraska Court of Appeals. She was the first woman in the state to serve on a court higher than the district court. After four years on the Nebraska Court of Appeals, Miller-Lerman became Chief Judge, a position she held from 1995 to 1998.

In 1998, Miller-Lerman took office as a Nebraska Supreme Court Judge for District 2, replacing retiring Judge D. Nick Caporale. She was retained in office in 2002 and 2008.

Notable cases 
 Keystone Pipeline

Other 
In 1993, Miller-Lerman's name was mentioned as being under consideration in the selection process for United States Attorney General during Bill Clinton's presidency. Senator J. James Exon was one of her supporters. Janet Reno was eventually selected for the position.

Publication 
Miller-Lerman has been published in the following journals: Creighton Law Review; Litigation News & Notes; ABA Journal; The National Law Journal; Columbia Law Review; Wisconsin Law Review; Annals of Internal Medicine.

Personal life 
Miller-Lerman was a member of the United States 1961 Maccabiah Games swimming team in Israel, where she won two gold medals and one silver medal.

In 1969, Miller-Lerman married Dr. Stephen Lerman. They had 2 children. The marriage ended in divorce.

See also 
 List of female state supreme court justices

References

Further reading 
 Gradwohl, Judge Janice L. "Inching Through the Glass Ceiling: The History of the Selection of Women Judges in Nebraska." Nebraska State Bar Association. The Nebraska Lawyer: The Official Publication of the Nebraska State Bar Association. Lincoln, NE: The Association, April 2000. pp. 12–18. 
 Miller-Lerman, Lindsey. "Should Part-Time Lawyers Stay on the Partnership Track?" American Bar Association. ABA Journal. Chicago: American Bar Association, January 1, 1987. p. 36.  
 Sorenson, Laurel. "Life Beyond the Law Office." American Bar Association. ABA Journal. Chicago: American Bar Association, July 1984. Volume 70 pp. 68–71.

External links 
 Lindsay Miller-Lerman at Nebraska Supreme Court

1947 births
Living people
Columbia Law School alumni
Maccabiah Games gold medalists for the United States
Maccabiah Games silver medalists for the United States
Justices of the Nebraska Supreme Court
Politicians from Omaha, Nebraska
Wellesley College alumni
Women in Nebraska politics
Lawyers from Omaha, Nebraska
20th-century American judges
21st-century American judges
Maccabiah Games medalists in swimming
20th-century American women judges
21st-century American women judges
21st-century American Jews